The 2022 FIFA U-20 Women's World Cup Final was the final match of the 2022 FIFA U-20 Women's World Cup in Costa Rica. The match was played at the Estadio Nacional de Costa Rica, San José on 28 August 2022 and was contested by Spain and Japan. For the first time ever, the FIFA U-20 Women's World Cup Final was a repeat of the previous edition's Final, as Japan had beaten Spain to win their first title on 2018 by a 3–1 scoreline.  However, things were different on 2022. Spain won the 2022 Final after defeating Japan by a 3–1 win after 90 minutes of action, now with the 3–1 score being on their favour, bouncing back from the previous edition. It was Spain's first-ever FIFA U-20 Women's World Cup title, with them now being only the second European national team to win the tournament within all the 10 editions of the tournament.

Road to the final

Match

Details

References

Final
Japan women's national football team matches